John Grimaldi  (25 May 1955 – 12 December 1983) was a musician, songwriter, and artist. He was born in St Albans, Hertfordshire, United Kingdom. Grimaldi was educated at St Albans School, where he developed his talent for electric jazz, songwriting, and art. His career focused on the Jazz genre, although he played other genres. Grimaldi formed several bands and wrote and performed until his death from multiple sclerosis in 1983.

Musical career

Motiffe
(1972) 
Grimaldi became interested in music after he joined his school's orchestra in his early teenage years. While in the school orchestra, he discovered his talent with stringed instruments and his ability to write music. John and Mark Pasterfield set up a school band called Motiffe in 1970. As Pasterfield had a drum kit, he became the drummer; Dave Shackley played bass; Ian Wilson, Quentin Bryar, and Steve Bellingham played keyboards. Bellingham left in 1971, and Mick Avery then joined on the keyboard. In early 1972 they reached their live peak with a support slot to Roy Wood and Jeff Lynne's ELO; shortly after they were recorded live in St Albans School by Deroy; 100 copies of the album were produced, some of which were still around in 2013.

Flux
(1972–1974) 
Soon afterward in 1972, there was conflict within Motiffe regarding what and how much the band should play. To resolve to conflict, John Grimaldi and Dave Shackley started a new band named Flux, aiming to become professional. Neil Chapman (drums) and Phil Hawkins (keyboard) joined to make up the band. Flux was recorded, though nothing was released. Flux also performed live, and started to attract some attention. The St Albans band Babe Ruth and their management took Flux under their wing. In late 1972 Flux was gaining in popularity and receiving interest from the music industry. Chapman left to be replaced by Charlie Chandler from Hemel Hempstead on drums; Dave Punshon (keyboard) left Babe Ruth to join Flux; however, he agreed to continue live performances with Babe Ruth until a replacement was found. Richard Blanchard, a flute, sax & vocalist from Pinner joined. The band, with this line-up, played regularly & widely including 100 clubs & Marquee.

Flux recorded a demo for EMI harvest at Manchester Square and was nearly signed, but it did not happen. However, there was interest from other companies. Punshon left to live with the Divine Light Movement and was replaced by pro circuit musician Zoë Kronberger (keyboard). Chandler left to rebuild antique furniture and was replaced by pro circuit musician Nick Monas (drums). Blanchard, who was also a professional photographer, left to focus on the increasing demands of his photography work and to pursue other music opportunities. He was replaced by circuit pro Jon Gifford (flute/sax).

Kronberger and Monas eventually left in mid-1974. Soon afterward, John did the Argent audition and went to them, resulting in Flux folding in late 1974.

A vinyl LP of a Flux live gig at St Albans City Hall in 1973 was released on Seelie Court Records (cat. no. SCLP005) in 2020. The line-up was Grimaldi (guitar), Dave Punshon (keyboards), Richard Blanshard (sax, flute and vocals), Dave Shackley (bass) and Charlie Chandler (drums).

Argent
(1974 – 1975/76)In 1974, Russ Ballard left Argent; Grimaldi and John Verity joined the band to replace him. Their entry into the band was partly due to their being from the same town and school as Rod Argent, the band's founder. John was involved in the Circus and Counterpoints albums, contributing to the Artwork as well as musically. He also played at the Roundhouse in 1975, a video of which is still held by John Verity.
When the band came off the road in 1975, John left to organize The John Grimaldi Band, which became Captain Sussex, and then Cheap Flights.

Captain Sussex
(1975–1976) 
Captain Sussex came out of the John Grimaldi Band. John's Jazz Rock leanings came to the fore during this time, playing with many such as: 
John Giblin (Bass / Vocals)
Mick Parker (Keyboards)
Preston Heyman (Drums).

Cheap Flights
Coming out of Captain Sussex there followed 4 years of Cheap Flights. This band went through 3 major versions, but was firmly planted in the Jazz Rock genre.
(1976 – 1977)

This first version of Cheap Flights was pure Jazz Rock of the highest calibre. John collaborated with
Peter Arneson (Rubettes) on Keyboards
Dan K Brown (The Fixx) on Bass
Cliff Venner – Percussion
Pete Ernest – Second guitar and Vocals
This lineup of Cheap Flights produced the signature track "Cheap Day Return". Although they had a number of gigs in the London and Hertfordshire area, and had a studio tape produced by Tony Visconti, the producer on the Counterpoints album for Argent, they had little success in attracting the attention of the record companies.
(1977–1978)

Peter Arneson left in 1977 to pursue other projects, as did Pete Ernest, which resulted in John inviting his schoolfriend, and former Motiffe member, Mark Pasterfield to join the band. This produced a comic element to the performances and a stabilizing effect on John. 
The band's music moved slightly away from the Jazz, and more into Rock, though still with the 'Grimaldi' touch.
The band gigged more successfully in the London and Hertfordshire areas, as well as moving into the West Country. Dan Brown and Cliff Venner moved on leaving a gap, which was filled by various musicians, until Carmello Luigeri, and Brett Salmon and Dave Taylor, from the English Rogues, joined, providing more stability to the band. 
It was this lineup that landed an 8 night tour of the Netherlands in Oct/Nov 1978. The 28 October gig at the Gigant, in Apeldoorn was recorded, it is thought, by the Hilversum 3 radio station, but this recording is missing.
(1978–1980)
In 1978 Mark had to leave for medical reasons, leaving the 4 piece of:
John Grimaldi  – Lead Guitar / Vocals
Brett Salmon   – Second Guitar / Backing Vocals
Dave Taylor    – Percussion
Carmelo Luggeri– Bass
This lineup lasted for a good two years, expanding their horizons around the country on the pub and club and college circuit. They produced a single, financed by a stalwart in the fan club, which sold 5000 copies, but were still struggling to find that elusive album deal.

Adrian Stamford
(1977–1979)
John experimented with all types of music, instruments, and genres. He created Adrian Stamford, an alter ego, under which he would write for the purely experimental sounds that would not fit in with his other projects. A number of these came out in the Cheap Flights catalog, such as his use of the H&H echo machine to replay his guitar solos, live, on stage, as can be heard in 'Snakes in the Ice' and 'The Cause' (titled as invariably this would break the machine, which H&H would fix for free, regularly, without actually investigating 'The Cause'!!)

Casual Athletes
(1980–1982)
Casual Athletes was the last project John was involved in. Although they did not perform live, John had written a number of songs specifically for the CA, and a demo tape was produced in a recording studio in Hertfordshire, funded by Pete Waterman. John was able to experiment with a drum machine during these sessions, as a suitable drummer was not available.

The lineup of the Casual Athletes was meant to be:
John Grimaldi – Keyboards
Brett Salmon  – Guitar

The studio recordings were on a different line up of: 
John Grimaldi – Keyboards
Brett Salmon  – Guitar
Dan Brown – Bass
Linn Electronics – Drum Machine

Discography

Studio albums

Motiffe

Argent

Singles

Cheap Flights

References

External links
 The Music Archive of John Grimaldi
 John Verity's Website
 Brett Salmon
 Dan Brown – The Fixx

1955 births
1983 deaths
Argent (band) members
People educated at St Albans School, Hertfordshire
People from St Albans
British people of Italian descent